3XL was one of the television channels operated by the Catalan public television network Televisió de Catalunya. It was founded and started broadcasting in September 2010 replacing the former Canal 300, until September 2012, when it was closed.

The channel takes its name from the former block transmitted in the Canal 33, also this channel seeks to promote a social network in his site.

This channel used to broadcast in Catalan daily from 21:30 to 6:00. It was mainly targeted at young people between 16 and 25 years. Its frequency was shared with Canal Super 3, which broadcast for the rest of the day. Its main programmes were British and Catalan series, movies and anime.

External links
Official Site

References

Televisió de Catalunya
Television stations in Catalonia
Television channels and stations established in 2010
Television channels and stations disestablished in 2012